The 1953–54 Deportivo Toluca F.C. season was the 4th season in the football club's history as a professional team and the 1st season in the top flight of Mexican football.

The team competed in the Primera División and Copa México. After winning the 1952–53 Segunda División, Toluca made its debut at Primera División on 9 August 1953 winning 2–1 against Atlante.

Coaching staff

Competitions

Overview

Primera División

Matches

Copa México

Group stage
<onlyinclude>

Statistics

Goals

References

Deportivo Toluca F.C. seasons